Leporinus tristriatus is a species of Leporinus found in the Amazon in Brazil in South America.

Etymology
It is named tri- meaning three; and striatus, meaning striped, referring to the three dark stripes on the body.

References

Taxa named by José Luis Olivan Birindelli
Taxa named by Heraldo Antonio Britski
Taxa described in 2013
Fish described in 2013
Anostomidae